The following is a list of Nippon Professional Baseball players with the last name starting with P, retired or active.

P

References

External links
Japanese Baseball

 P